Robert Choquette (born 25 November 1954) is a Canadian rower. He competed in the men's eight event at the 1976 Summer Olympics.

References

1954 births
Living people
Canadian male rowers
Olympic rowers of Canada
Rowers at the 1976 Summer Olympics
Rowers from St. Catharines
Pan American Games medalists in rowing
Pan American Games gold medalists for Canada
Rowers at the 1975 Pan American Games